The 2009 Recopa Sudamericana was the 17th Recopa Sudamericana, an annual football match between the winners of the previous season's Copa Libertadores and Copa Sudamericana competitions.

The match was contested by Ecuadorian club LDU Quito, the 2008 Copa Libertadores champion, and Brazilian club Internacional, the 2008 Copa Sudamericana champion. LDU Quito won both games of the Recopa 1–0 and 3–0, respectively. Thus, Liga de Quito won their Recopa Sudamericana title and their second international title.

Qualified teams

Venues

Matches

First leg

Second leg

References

External links
2009 Recopa Sudamericana official site 
Official rules 
LDU Quito's official website 
Internacional's official website 

REc
2009
2009 in Ecuadorian football
2009 in Brazilian football
L.D.U. Quito matches
Sport Club Internacional matches